Li Meng-yen (born 12 December 1966) is a Taiwanese politician. In an acting capacity, he was Mayor of Tainan from 8 September 2017 until 25 December 2018. Li has served as Secretary-General of the Executive Yuan since 14 January 2019.

Education
Li obtained his bachelor's degree in environmental engineering from National Chung Hsing University and master's degree in water science and engineering from UNESCO-IHE in the Netherlands.

Political career
Li had been the assistant engineer and branch head of Housing and Urban Development Bureau of Taiwan Provincial Government. At the Taipei County Government, he had been the section chief and technical specialist of Public Works Bureau and acting and vice director-general of Water Resource Bureau and secretary. At the Public Construction Commission, he was the vice director of Department of Construction Management. At the Taipei City Government, he was the director of Sewerage Systems Office of Public Works Department.

Tainan City Government
In the Tainan City Government, he was the director-general of Water Resource Bureau and secretary-general. Li was appointed acting Tainan Mayor on 7 September 2017 as William Lai was named Premier of the Republic of China by President Tsai Ing-wen. Speaking at a summit held at National Cheng Kung University in June 2018, Li said that his city government aimed to declare English as the second official language of Tainan, starting by having bilingual signs on information at major public places.

Executive Yuan
He took office as secretary-general of the Executive Yuan on 14 January 2019, with the second Su Tseng-chang cabinet. Li was named the spokesman of the Executive Yuan on an interim basis on 15 November 2020, following the resignation of Ting Yi-ming from the position.

References

1966 births
Living people
Mayors of Tainan
Politicians of the Republic of China on Taiwan from Changhua County